Derrick Lee Murdock (aka "Dock," born December 13, 1957 in Philadelphia) is an American Bassist, Composer and Producer.  He is best known as the former house bassist on The Tonight Show with Jay Leno led by Musical Conductor Kevin Eubanks on The Tonight Show with Jay Leno   from (2006–2011). He currently lives in Los Angeles.

Professional music career
Murdock attended the College of Performing Arts at the University of the Arts in Philadelphia, and studied under Craig Thomas. His previous mentors include Al Stauffer and Tony Smith, a solo bassist who is best known for creating self-instructional DVDs on how to play the electric bass.

In 1992, Murdock began touring with Miles Jaye and has had an active musical career since. Some of the artists he has performed and/or recorded with include Sheena Easton, Capital Cities, Michael Bolton, BB King, Chuck Berry, Dr. Dre, Will Smith, Patti Austin, Natalie Cole, Huey Lewis, Rose Royce, Mandrill, Cedric the Entertainer, Jim Carrey, Bill Cosby, Solomon Burke, The 5th Dimension,  Marilyn McCoo, Billy Davis Jr., Peter Frampton, The Jazz Crusaders, Frank Gambale, Tom Scott, Jeff Lorber, Eric Marienthal, Cherrelle, The Dazz Band, Deniece Williams, Andraé Crouch, Bobby Caldwell, Angela Bofill, Thelma Houston, David Benoit, Hugh Masekela, Bobby Lyle, Bob Mamet, Jon Lucien, and Miles Jaye.

The Tonight Show with Jay Leno
In 2004, Murdock ran into Kevin Eubanks in Las Vegas and began working with his band before joining The Tonight Show Band on The Tonight Show with Jay Leno from 2006 to 2011. Eubanks maintained his own band apart from the show to expand his personal music horizons. Murdock toured with this band on the weekends from 2007 to 2010 and performed with the Tonight Show Band through the 18th season of the show, when Eubanks left.

The Jay Leno Show
Kevin Eubanks and the Tonight Show Band became The Primetime Band as The Tonight Show transitioned into The Jay Leno Show. The short-lived series aired at 10 PM for four months from 2009 to 2010 but was cancelled due to poor ratings and time slot conflicts with other shows. Although several members of the band left, Murdock was one of the few who stayed with Eubanks through the Primetime Band and the Tonight Show.

Equipment
Murdock uses the TC Electronic RH450 head, RS210, RS410, RS212 cabinet and Roland Cube-120XL for amplification. He plays on basses by Fender, Ken Smith, and Demars Guitars.

Selected discography
With Bryan Savage
Soul Temptation (1998)

With Bob Mamet
Adventures in Jazz (1997)

With Goin Public
Free Exchange (1996)

With the Jazz Crusaders
Power of Our Music: The Endangered Species (2000)

With Mandrill
Driving While Black and Brown (2001)

With Rose Royce
Greatest Hits (2002)
Greatest Hits: Studio Cut CD (2009)

References

External links

1957 births
American male composers
20th-century American composers
Record producers from Pennsylvania
Living people
Guitarists from Philadelphia
American male bass guitarists
20th-century American bass guitarists
20th-century American male musicians
The Tonight Show Band members